Kinsale is an unincorporated community in Westmoreland County, in the U. S. state of Virginia. It was named after Kinsale, in Ireland.

During the War of 1812, the Royal Marines Battalions raided the entrance to the Yeocomico River, which concluded with the capture of four schooners at the town of Kinsale, Virginia (August 1814).

The Kinsale Historic District was listed on the National Register of Historic Places in 2005. There is a small museum near the town commons dedicated to its history.

References

 Kinsale Foundation

Unincorporated communities in Virginia
Unincorporated communities in Westmoreland County, Virginia